Berlin-Steglitz-Zehlendorf is an electoral constituency (German: Wahlkreis) represented in the Bundestag. It elects one member via first-past-the-post voting. Under the current constituency numbering system, it is designated as constituency 79. It is located in southwestern Berlin, comprising the Steglitz-Zehlendorf borough.

Berlin-Steglitz-Zehlendorf was created for the inaugural 1990 federal election after German reunification. Since 2017, it has been represented by Thomas Heilmann of the Christian Democratic Union (CDU).

Geography
Berlin-Steglitz-Zehlendorf is located in southwestern Berlin. As of the 2021 federal election, it is coterminous with the Steglitz-Zehlendorf borough.

History
Berlin-Steglitz-Zehlendorf was created after German reunification in 1990. In the 1990 election, it was constituency 252 in the numbering system. In the 1994 and 1998 elections, it was number 253. In the 2002 through 2009 elections, it was number 80. Since the 2013 election, it has been number 79.

Originally, the constituency comprised the boroughs of Steglitz and Zehlendorf, excluding the area of Steglitz east of the Teltow Canal, specifically the locality of Lankwitz and part of Lichterfelde. In the 1994 and 1998 elections, it comprised the entirety of Steglitz and Zehlendorf boroughs. Since their merger ahead of the 2002 election, it has been coterminous with the Steglitz-Zehlendorf borough.

Members
The constituency was first represented by Gero Pfennig of the Christian Democratic Union (CDU) from 1990 to 1998. It was won by the Social Democratic Party (SPD) in 1998 and represented by Renate Rennebach until 2002, followed by Klaus Uwe Benneter until 2005. Karl-Georg Wellmann of the CDU was elected in 2005, and re-elected in 2009 and 2013. He was succeeded by fellow CDU member Thomas Heilmann in the 2017 election.

Election results

2021 election

2017 election

2013 election

2009 election

References

Federal electoral districts in Berlin
Steglitz-Zehlendorf
1990 establishments in Germany
Constituencies established in 1990